This is a list of notable people who were born, lived or are/were famously associated with Rome, Italy.

A

 Daniel Acon
 Paul Adam
 Pope Adeodatus I
 Giorgio Agamben
 Pope Agapetus I
 Andrea Aiuti
 Paolo Alatri
 Gian Francesco Albani
 Giuseppe Albani
 Vincenzo Albrici
 Pietro Aldobrandini
 Alessandro Alessandroni
 Alexius of Rome
 Alfonso, Duke of Anjou and Cádiz
 Infante Alfonso of Spain
 Domenico Allegri
 Gregorio Allegri
 Agnese Allegrini
 Enrico Alleva
 Ilaria Alpi
 Giovanna Amati
 Maurizio Amati
 Claudio Amendola
 Giorgio Amendola
 Niccolò Ammaniti
 Franco Amurri
 Pope Anastasius IV
 Benjamin ben Abraham Anaw
 Zedekiah ben Abraham Anaw
 Giulio Andreotti
 Lucilla Andreucci
 Felice Anerio
 Giovanni Francesco Anerio
 Marco Angeletti
 Filippo d'Angeli
 Roberta Angelilli
 Fiorenzo Angelini
 Ambra Angiolini
 Luca Antei
 Richard Antinucci
 Silvio Antoniano
 Mark Antony
 Guillaume Apollinaire
 Alberto Aquilani
 Tullia d'Aragona
 Daniele Archibugi
 Francesca Archibugi
 Giulia Arcioni
 Maurizio Arena
 Asia Argento
 Claudio Argento
 Dario Argento
 Carlo Armellini
 Francesco Arquati
 Giuditta Tavani Arquati
 Antonella Attili
 Corrado Augias
 Augustine of Canterbury
 Augustus
 Alessia Aureli
 Marcus Aurelius
 Umberto Avattaneo
 Carlo Aymonino

B

Ba–Bm

 Samuele Bacchiocchi
 Marcello Bacciarelli
 Giovanni Baglione
 Jorge de Bagration
 Giuseppe Baini
 Andrea Bajani
 Renato Baldini
 Silvia Baraldini
 Luca Barbarossa
 Anton Giuseppe Barbazza
 Antonio Barberini
 Urbano Barberini
 Enzo Barboni
 Paolo Barelli
 Andrea Bargnani
 Filippo Barigioni
 Gianfranco Barra
 Steve Bastoni
 Stefano di Battista
 Stefano Battistelli
 Lamberto Bava
 Marco Belladonna
 Dario Bellezza
 Giuseppe Gioachino Belli
 Francesco Bellissimo
 Alessandra Belloni
 Claudio Bellucci
 Pope Benedict V
 Marco Benefial
 Valerio Bernabò
 Antonino Bernardini
 Laura Bernasconi
 Luciano Bernasconi
 Ernesto Bertarelli
 Franca Bettoia
 Max Biaggi
 Laura Biagiotti
 Alessandro Bianchi
 Andrea Bianchi
 Daniela Bianchi
 Giorgio Bianchi
 Orazio Bianchi
 Angela Bianchini
 Paola Binetti
 Giovanni Bisignani
 Alessandro Blasetti
 Ilary Blasi

Bn–Bz

 Salvatore Boccaccio
 Tanio Boccia
 Alessandro Boccolini
 Camillo Boito
 Paolo Bonacelli
 Massimo Bonanni
 Lucien Louis Joseph Napoleon Bonaparte
 Pierre Napoleon Bonaparte
 Carla Boni
 Pope Boniface III
 Joseph Bonomi the Elder
 Camillo Borghese, 6th Prince of Sulmona
 Francesco Scipione Maria Borghese
 Junio Valerio Borghese
 Marcantonio Borghese, 5th Prince of Sulmona
 Scipione Borghese
 Cesare Borgia
 Giovanni Borgia
 Orazio Borgianni
 Mariacarla Boscono
 Giuseppe Bottai
 Raoul Bova
 Jole Bovio Marconi
 Cesare Bovo
 Pietro Bracci
 Pierre Savorgnan de Brazza
 Mario Brega
 Alfonso Brescia
 Oscar Brevi
 Lilla Brignone
 Andrea Briotti
 Alex Britti
 Riccardo Brosco
 Constantino Brumidi
 Cristian Bucchi
 Lorenzo Bucchi
 Marianna Bulgarelli
 Ernesto Buonaiuti
 Margherita Buy
 Guido Buzzelli

C

Ca–Cm

 Nicola Cabibbo
 Giulio Caccini
 Julius Caesar
 Leone Caetani
 Mario Caiano
 Giulio Calì
 Mario Camerini
 Bernardino Cametti
 Princess Camilla, Duchess of Castro
 Achille Campanile
 Vincenzo Camuccini
 Giuseppe Canale
 Matteo Cancellieri
 Antonio Candreva
 Giovanni Angelo Canini
 Pompeo Cannicciari
 Federico Capasso
 Daniele Capezzone
 Gaetano Capocci
 Cristiana Capotondi
 Kaspar Capparoni
 Antonella Capriotti
 Andrea Carandini
 Francesco Carbone
 Lianella Carell
 Fabio Caressa
 Alberto Carlieri
 Vito Carnevali
 Angelo Caroselli
 Mario Carotenuto
 Memmo Carotenuto
 Stefano Caruso
 Giovanni Battista Casali
 Sandro Casamonica
 Stefano Caselli
 Mario Caserini
 Carlo Cassola
 Francesco Castellacci
 Enzo G. Castellari
 Pietro Castelli
 Claudio Castellini
 Sergio Castellitto
 Emilio de' Cavalieri
 Giacomo Cavalieri
 Simona Cavallari
 Pietro Cavallini
 Victor Cavallo
 Suso Cecchi d'Amico
 Rosalinda Celentano
 Pope Celestine I
 Gaspare Celio
 Rodolfo Celletti
 Beatrice Cenci
 Giuseppe Ceracchi
 Michelangelo Cerquozzi
 Michelangelo Cerruti
 Enzo Cerusico
 Valentina Cervi
 Giuseppe Cesari
 Federico Cesi
 Flavio Chigi
 Giuseppe Ciancabilla
 Fabrizio Cicchitto
 Luigi Cimara
 Flavio Cipolla
 Chiara Civello
 Donna Marina Torlonia di Civitella-Cesi
 Pope Clement X
 Muzio Clementi

Cn–Cz

 Filippo Coarelli
 Armando Colafrancesco
 Stefano Colantuono
 Veniero Colasanti
 Lelio Colista
 Giuseppe Colizzi
 Michael Collins
 Eugenio Colombo
 Paola Colonna
 Pompeo Colonna
 Francesca Comencini
 Emanuele Concetti
 Ercole Consalvi
 Bernardo Consorti
 Sandro Continenza
 Stefano Coppa
 Manuel Coppola
 Bruno Corbucci
 Sergio Corbucci
 Giovanni Corbyons
 Scipio Africanus
 Aemilia Tertia
 Lucius Cornelius Scipio
 Renato Corsetti
 Simone Corsi
 Giovanni Costa
 Antonella Costa
 Placido Costanzi
 Maurizio Costanzo
 Emanuele Crialese
 Simone Cristicchi
 Princess Cristina of Bourbon-Two Sicilies
 Paola Croce
 Lorella Cuccarini
 Gianluca Curci

D

 Massimo D'Alema
 Dominic D'Alessandro
 Marco D'Alessandro
 Joe D'Amato
 Paolo Damiani
 Ilaria D'Amico
 Francesca Dani
 Daniel ben Judah
 Damiano David
 Augusto De Angelis
 Elio de Angelis
 Guido & Maurizio De Angelis
Victoria De Angelis
 Andrea de Cesaris
 Filippo De Grassi
 Francesco De Gregori
 Aurelio De Laurentiis
 Giada De Laurentiis
 Veronica De Laurentiis
 Sylvio de Lellis
 Giuseppe De Luca
 Enrico De Pedis
 Daniele De Rossi
 Giovanni Battista de Rossi
 Mattia de Rossi
 Maurizio De Santis
 Lorenzo De Silvestri
 Giancarlo De Sisti
 Claudio De Sousa
 Daniele De Vezze
 Raffaele De Vita
 Emiliano Dei
 Lorenzo Del Prete
 Claudio Della Penna
 Pietro Della Valle
 Tonino Delli Colli
 Gabriele Dell'Otto
 Augusto De Marsanich
 Agostino Di Bartolomei
 Luigi Di Biagio
 Paolo Di Canio
 Valerio Di Cesare
 Nello Di Costanzo
 Angelo Di Livio
 Carlo Di Palma
 Alessio di Savino
 Marco Di Vaio
 Andrea Di Vito
 Silvia Dionisio
 Domitian
 Maurizio Domizzi
 Sergio Donati
 Cristiano Doni
 Mario Draghi
 Serafino Dubois
 Francesco Borgongini Duca
 Alessandro Duranti

E

 Elio Germano
 Eduard Ender
 Guglielmo Epifani
 Franco Evangelisti
 Julius Evola

F

 Enrico Fabbro
 Quintus Fabius Maximus Verrucosus
 Aldo Fabrizi
 Michel Fabrizio
 Federica Faiella
 Stefano Fanucci
 Felice Farina
 Prospero Farinacci
 Alexander Farnese, Duke of Parma
 Odoardo Farnese
 Pier Luigi Farnese, Duke of Parma
 Ada Feinberg-Sireni
 Fortunato Felice
 Pope Felix I
 Prince Ferdinand Pius, Duke of Calabria
 Sabrina Ferilli
 Enrico Fermi
 Giuliano Ferrara
 Ettore Ferrari
 Attilio Ferraris
 Anna Maria Ferrero
 Ciro Ferri
 Gabriella Ferri
 Luca Ferri
 Gabriele Ferzetti
 Domenico Fetti
 Franca Fiacconi
 Michael Fiaschetti
 Alessia Filippi
 Bruno Finesi
 Roberto Fiore
 Valerio Fiori
 Fabio Firmani
 Giancarlo Fisichella
 Lucius Caesetius Flavus
 Alessandro Florenzi
 Marco Follini
 Marcello Fondato
 Eleonora Fonseca Pimentel
 Francesco Fonte
 Pope Formosus
 Cesare Francalancia
 Frances of Rome
 Daniele Franceschini
 Franco Frasi
 Franco Fraticelli
 Franco Frattini
 Giovanni Frattini
 Gianluca Freddi
 Giammarco Frezza
 Giorgio Frezzolini
 Princess Ira von Fürstenberg
 Massimiliano Fuksas
 Lucio Fulci
 Pietro Fumasoni Biondi
 Marcia Furnilla

G

 Giulio Gabrielli the Younger
 Riccardo Galeazzi-Lisi
 Anna Galiena
 Maria Monaci Gallenga
 Daniele Galloppa
 Giuseppe Garibaldi
 Carlo Giorgio Garofalo
 Matteo Garrone
 Riccardo Garrone
 Alessandro Gassman
 Luciano Gaucci
 Giuliano Gemma
 Augusto Genina
 Enrico Gennari
 Giuseppe Gentile
 Artemisia Gentileschi
 Aloysius Gentili
 Paolo Gentiloni
 Claudia Gerini
 Gerino Gerini
 Publius Septimius Geta
 Riccardo Ghedin
 Massimo Ghini
 Andrea Ghiurghi
 Tata Giacobetti
 Dante Giacosa
 Adriano Giannini
 Giuseppe Giannini
 Maurizio Giglio
 Enrico Gilardi
 Giles of Rome
 Cristiano Gimelli
 Ludovico Gimignani
 Caterina Ginnasi
 Alberto Giolitti
 Pierluigi Giombini
 Bruno Giordano
 Domiziana Giordano
 Eleonora Giorgi
 Miriam Giovanelli
 Giovanna of Italy
 Italo Gismondi
 Giuseppe Giulietti
 Ignazio Giunti
 Leda Gloria
 Francesco Golisano
 Gonzalo, Duke of Aquitaine
 Carlo Grano
 Ugo Grappasonni
 Francesca Gregorini
 Pope Gregory I
 Fabio Grossi
 Romolo Guerrieri
 Monica Guerritore
 Vittorio Gui
 Umberto Guidoni
 Gaspar de Guzmán, Count-Duke of Olivares
 Corrado Guzzanti
 Paolo Guzzanti
 Sabina Guzzanti

H

 Hadrian
 Ottone Hamerani
 Constantin Hansen
 Vanessa Hessler
 Paolo Heusch
 Pope Honorius IV
 Pope Honorius III
 Honorius of Canterbury
 Danny Huston

I

 Emanuele Idini
 Immanuel the Roman
 Fiorella Infascelli
 Stefano Infessura
 Pope Innocent II
 Pope Innocent X
 Franco Interlenghi

J

 Giuseppe Jannaconi
 Pope John XIX
 Pope John III
 John the Deacon of the Lateran
 Romina Johnson
 Renato William Jones
 Jovanotti
 Juan Carlos I of Spain
 Pope Julius I
 Pope Julius III
 Justus

K

 Shahrum Kashani
 Tony Kendall
 Claudia Koll
 Sylva Koscina
 Fiorella Kostoris
 Ciril Kotnik

L

 Silvio Lafuenti
 Rodolfo Lanciani
 Stefano Landi
 Lapo da Castiglionchio
 Umberto Massimo Lattuca
 Mariano Laurenti
 Filippo Lauri
 Flavio Lazzari
 Pietro Lazzari
 Stefano Lentini
 Sergio Leone
 Carlo Leoni
 Ottavio Leoni
 Giulio Liberati
 Luca Lionello
 Artus de Lionne
 Fabio Liverani
 Barbara Livi
 Carlo Lizzani
 Andrea Locatelli
 Giovanni Lombardo Radice
 Sophia Loren
 Claudio Lotito
 Ray Lovelock
 Rosetta Loy
 Gianni Hecht Lucari
 Franco Lucentini
 Daniele Luchetti
 Pope Lucius I
 Lucullus
 Marco Luly
 Diana Luna
 Amos Luzzatto

M

Ma-Mn

 Ruggero Maccari
 Joel McHale
 Federico Macheda
 Francisco Macri
 Stefano Madia
 Raimundo de Madrazo y Garreta
 Federico de Madrazo
 Daniele Magliocchetti
 Tiziano Maggiolini
 Anna Magnani
 Teoberto Maler
 Franco Maria Malfatti
 Hortense Mancini
 Marie Mancini
 Olympia Mancini
 Francesco Mander
 Silvana Mangano
 Fiorella Mannoia
 Corrado Mantoni
 Faustina Maratti
 Vipsania Marcella
 Gaius Epidius Marcellus
 Francesco Marchetti Selvaggiani
 Carlo Marchionni
 Marco Marchionni
 Enrico Marconi
 Francesco Marconi
 Maria Marconi
 Tommaso Marconi
 Pope Mark
 Alessia Marcuzzi
 Infanta Margarita, 2nd Duchess of Hernani
 Antonio Margheriti
 Princess Maria Theresa of Löwenstein-Wertheim-Rosenberg
 Princess Marie Louise of Bourbon-Parma
 Giovanna Marini
 Tania di Mario
 Francesco Marmaggi
 Anton von Maron
 Therese Maron
 Marozia
 Piero Marrazzo
 Otello Martelli
 Pope Martin V
 Alessandra Martines
 Daniele Martinetti
 Alberto De Martino
 Sergio Martino
 Carl Marzani
 Francesco Maselli
 Giulietta Masina
 Lea Massari
 Camillo Massimo
 Chiara Mastalli
 Corrado Mastantuono
 Camillo Mastrocinque
 Ruggero Mastroianni
 Agostino Masucci
 Raffaello Matarazzo
 Bruno Mattei
 Leonardo Maugeri
 Girolama Mazzarini
 Gian Luca Mazzella
 Carlo Mazzone

Mb–Mz

 Melania the Younger
 Giordano Meloni
 Ricky Memphis
 Menahem ben Solomon
 Michele Mercati
 Adalberto Maria Merli
 Maurizio Merli
 Marisa Merlini
 Valeria Messalina
 Metastasio
 Fernando Mezzasoma
 Giovanna Mezzogiorno
 Martina Miceli
 Prince Michael of Greece and Denmark
 Maria Michi
 Alba Milana
 Dario Minieri
 Michelangelo Minieri
 Christian Minotti
 Dante Mircoli
 Eduardo Missoni
 Franco Modigliani
 Paolo Moffa
 Maurizio Molinari
 Antonio Monda
 Massimo Mongai
 Riccardo Morandi
 Elsa Morante
 Alberto Moravia
 Alessandro Morbidelli
 Emiliano Moretti
 Luigi Moretti
 Nanni Moretti
 Massimo Moriconi
 Gaetano Moroni
 Ennio Morricone
 Massimo Morsello
 Riccardo Moscatelli
 Gabriele Muccino
 Silvio Muccino
 Luigi Musso
 Alessandra Mussolini
 Ornella Muti
 Roberto Muzzi

N

 Moses Nagari
 Gianluca Nani
 Armando Nannuzzi
 Napoleone Orsini Frangipani
 Stefano Napoleoni
 Marco Napolioni
 Archimede Nardi
 Mauro Nardoni
 Nathan ben Jehiel
 Alessandro Nesta
 Margit Evelyn Newton
 Pope Nicholas III
 Bruno Nicolai
 Prince Nikolaos of Greece and Denmark
 John Nobili
 Carlo Nocella

O

 Hugh O'Connor
 Carlo Odescalchi
 Cipriano Efisio Oppo
 Paolo Orano
 Alberto Orlando
 Fernando Orsi
 Giovanni Orsina
 Clarice Orsini
 Flavio Orsini
 Fulvio Orsini
 Alfredo Ottaviani

P

Pa–Pm

 Lina Pagliughi
 Lola Pagnani
 Giuseppe Palica
 Anita Pallenberg
 Gabriella Pallotta
 Silvana Pampanini
 Benedetto Pamphili
 Alessandra Panaro
 Adriano Panatta
 Claudio Panatta
 Paolo Panelli
 Patrizia Panico
 Giancarlo Pantano
 Gabriele Paoletti
 Arvid Pardo
 Ryan Paris
 Giorgio Parisi
 Gianfranco Parolini
 Cesare Pascarella
 Giovanni Battista Passeri
 Giuseppe Passeri
 Pope Paul V
 Pierfrancesco Pavoni
 Quintus Pedius
 Mario Pei
 Pope Pelagius I
 Pope Pelagius II
 Federico Peluso
 Jacopo Peri
 Ivo Perilli
 Luigi Pernier
 Lucilla Perrotta
 Giampietro Perrulli
 Manolo Pestrin
 Elio Petri
 Cinzia Petrucci
 Marcello Piacentini
 Carlo delle Piane
 Pier Ruggero Piccio
 Luigi Pichler
 Pier Luigi Cherubino
 Enrico Pieranunzi
 Pietro da Pietri
 Tommaso Pincio
 Bartolomeo Pinelli
 Ezio Pinza
 Giampiero Pinzi
 Piotta
 Alessandro Piperno
 Francesco Piranesi
 Emanuele Pirro
 Marco Pisano

Pn–Pz

 Claudio Pistolesi
 Pope Pius XII
 Violante Placido
 Giampiero Pocetta
 Sylvia Poggioli
 Maurizio Ponzi
 Mario Ponzo
 Stefano Porcari
 Daniele Portanova
 Andrea Pozzi
 Stefano Pozzi
 Matteo Pratichetti
 Giancarlo Prete
 Armando Preti
 Giancarlo Primo
 Andrea Procaccini
 Gigi Proietti
 Alessandro Proni
 Giorgio Prosperi
 Giuseppe Puglia

Q

 Daniele Quadrini
 Francesco Quinn
 Lorenzo Quinn
 Francesco Quintini

R

 Danny Raco
 Giacomo Raffaelli
 Pietro Raimondi
 Carlo Rainaldi
 Girolamo Rainaldi
 Giovanna Ralli
 Eros Ramazzotti
 Gianluca Ramazzotti
 Dean Reed
 Piero Regnoli
 Arcangelo Resani
 Bianca Riario
 Giuseppe Ricciotti
 Cola di Rienzo
 Alessandro Rinaldi
 Giuseppe Rinaldi
 Matteo Rizzo
 Giovanni Battista Rinuccini
 Albert Roccardi
 Ettore Roesler Franz
 Flavio Roma
 Luca Romagnoli
 Antoniazzo Romano
 Giovanni Cristoforo Romano
 Giulio Romano
 Judah ben Moses Romano
 Paolo Emilio Rondinini
 Aleandro Rosi
 Carlo Rosselli
 Ingrid Rossellini
 Isabella Rossellini
 Renzo Rossellini (composer)
 Renzo Rossellini (producer)
 Roberto Rossellini
 Kim Rossi Stuart
 Girolamo Rossi
 Luciano Rossi
 Giuseppe Rotunno
 Ludovico Rusconi Sassi
 Andrea Russotto
 Francesco Rutelli

S

Sa–Sm

 Gigi Sabani
 Antonio Sabàto, Jr.
 Ashraf Saber
 Antonio Sacconi
 Luigi Sagrati
 Alessio Sakara
 Luciano Salce
 Tommaso Salini
 Sergio Salvati
 Nicola Salvi
 Sampson the Hospitable
 Rafael Sánchez Ferlosio
 Aitana Sánchez-Gijón
 Valeria Sannucci
 Maya Sansa
 Mara Santangelo
 Vincenzo Santopadre
 Daniela Sanzone
 Giulio Aristide Sartorio
 Giovanni Battista Savelli
 Mirko Savini
 Princess Mafalda of Savoy
 Maria Anna of Savoy
 Luciana Sbarbati
 Mattia Sbragia
 Franca Scagnetti
 Giovanni Battista Scaramelli
 Pietro Filippo Scarlatti
 Rudolph Schadow
 Giancarlo Schiaffini
 Elsa Schiaparelli
 Ernesto Screpanti
 Scribonia
 Ezio Sella
 Andy Selva
 Franco Sensi
 Rosella Sensi
 Michele Sepe
 Luigi Serafini
 Clara Sereni
 Michele Serra
 Alessio Sestu
 Pope Severinus
 Guido Ascanio Sforza di Santa Fiora
 Giovanni Sgambati
 Alessandro Sgrigna
 Enrico Sgrulletti
 Sabrina Siani
 Enzo Siciliano
 Eugenio Sicomoro
 Glauco Signorini
 Luis Simarro Lacabra
 Simcha of Rome
 Pope Sixtus I

Sn–Sz

 Danilo Soddimo
 Sergio Sollima
 Bobby Solo
 Cornelio Sommaruga
 Alberto Sordi
 Pietro Spada
 Alessandro Specchi
 Innocenzo Spinazzi
 Altiero Spinelli
 Luciano Spinosi
 Francesco Statuto
 Simonetta Stefanelli
 Giacomo Gaetani Stefaneschi
 Roberto Stellone
 Pope Stephen I
 Cesare Sterbini
 Michael Stern
 Raffaele Stern
 Giampietro Stocco
 Paolo Stoppa
 Vittorio Storaro
 Alessandro Stradella
 Charles Edward Stuart
 Henry Benedict Stuart

T

 Fanny Tacchinardi Persiani
 Antonio Tajani
 Stefano Tamburini
 Domenico Tardini
 Mauro Tassotti
 Paola Taverna
 Marcus Terentius Varro Lucullus
 Christian Terlizzi
 Maurizio Thermes
 Camillo Tinti
 Simone Tiribocchi
 Tommaso Tittoni
 Titus
 Enrico Toccacelo
 Giorgia Todrani
 Maria Sole Tognazzi
 Gianni Togni
 Marilù Tolo
 Alessio Tombesi
 Tommyknocker
 Salvator Tongiorgi
 Giulio Tonti
 Cesare Torelli
 Alessandro Torlonia, 2nd Prince di Civitella-Cesi
 Augusto Torlonia, 3rd Prince di Civitella Cesi
 Giovanni Torlonia, 1st Prince di Civitella-Cesi
 Leopoldo Torlonia
 Barnaba Tortolini
 Enrico Toti
 Gianni Toti
 Francesco Totti
 Fausto Tozzi
 Trasilla and Emiliana
 Margarete Traube
 Leopoldo Trieste
 Trilussa
 Jasmine Trinca
 Licia Troisi
 Antonello Trombadori
 Alessandro Tulli
 Guido Turchi

U
 Pope Urban VII

V

 Giuseppe Valadier
 Giacomo Valentini
 Lorenzo Valla
 Bice Valori
 Carlo Vanzina
 Walter Veltroni
 Antonello Venditti
 Giovanni Francesco Venturini
 Carlo Verdone
 Renzo Vespignani
 Virginio Vespignani
 Giovanni Maria Vian
 Marco Vicario
 Uros Vico
 Pope Vigilius
 Claudio Villa
 Giulia Villoresi
 Vincent Pallotti
 Marcus Vinicius
 Valerio Virga
 Ennio Quirino Visconti
 Louis Visconti
 Milly Vitale
 Alvaro Vitali
 Mutio Vitelleschi
 Monica Vitti
 Gianluca Vivan
 Milena Vukotic

W

 John William Waterhouse
 Lina Wertmüller

Y
 Yiram of Magdiel

Z

 Luigi Zampa
 Alessandro Zamperini
 Daniel Zampieri
 Lamberto Zauli
 Carlo Zecchi
 Pope Zephyrinus
 Federico Zeri
 Renato Zero
 Bruno Zevi

See also

 List of Italians
 List of mayors of Rome

Rome
 
People